The 2006 Oakland mayoral election was held on June 7, 2006 to elect the mayor of Oakland, California. It saw the election of Ron Dellums.

Incumbent mayor Jerry Brown did not seek reelection to a third term, instead opting to run in the 2006 California Attorney General election.

A 50% margin of the vote needed to be obtained by the victor in order to avoid a runoff being held in November. Dellums surpassed this margin by a mere 115 votes, thus no runoff was necessitated.

Candidates
Ignacio De La Fuente, President of the Oakland City Council, member of the Oakland City Council since 1992, candidate for mayor in 1998
Ron Dellums, former U.S. congressman (1971-1998), former member of the Oakland City Council (1967-1971)
Arnie Fields, affordable housing provider, member of the Board of Directors for the Music & Art Department of the Arcadia Skate Hotel 
Nancy Nadel, member of the Oakland City Council
Ron "Oz" Oznowicz, investor and business manager, former Oakland Police Officer (1965-1976)
Hector "Reno" Reyna, retired financial consultant, perennial candidate

Results

References 

Oakland
2006
Oakland